Listen to Me Marlon is a 2015 British documentary film written, directed and edited by Stevan Riley about the movie star and iconic actor Marlon Brando.

Release
On July 29, 2015, Listen to Me Marlon was released theatrically in the United States; screening in over 140 cities during a ten-week run. The film was nominated for a Gotham Award.

Reception

Box office
Listen to Me Marlon grossed £47,869 (US$70,558) in the United Kingdom and $445,779 in other territories, for a total worldwide gross of $516,337.

Critical response
Upon its premiere in 2015, the film received positive reviews from critics.
On review aggregator Rotten Tomatoes, the film holds an approval rating of 96% based on 102 reviews, with an average rating of 8.0/10. The site's critical consensus reads, "Listen to Me Marlon offers a fascinating look at the inner life of a Hollywood icon, told in his own words."

The Village Voice calls it "a masterpiece" and David Edelstein lists it as "the greatest, most searching documentary of an actor ever put on film." According to Vanity Fair, it "is a compelling documentary about Marlon Brando compiled entirely from private audio tapes the actor recorded at home, in business meetings, during hypnosis, in therapy, and during press interviews."

Variety writes Brando's "complexity is limned as well as a documentary possibly could manage... Made with the full cooperation of the Brando estate, the pic is a superbly crafted collage whose soundtrack is as complexly textured as the curation and editing of visual elements." As Rolling Stone magazine summed it up, "You want Brando Confidential? Fine, you've got it."

Accolades

 Winner – Best Documentary at The 2015 San Francisco Film Critics Circle Awards
 Winner – IDA Creative Recognition Award for Best Writing
 Winner – 2015 Peabody Award 
 Winner – Best Film Founders Prize at the Traverse City Film Festival 2015
 Nominated – Best Documentary BAFTA
 Nominated – Best Documentary by The Phoenix Critics’ Circle
 Nominated – Best Feature IDA Award
 Nominated – Best Documentary at the 25th Gotham Independent Film Awards
 Nominated – World Cinema Documentary at the Sundance Film Festival 2015
 Nominated – Documentary Feature at the Montclair Film Festival 2015
 Nominated – Best Documentary at the 2015 Detroit Film Critics Society Awards
 Included in The National Board of Review’s Top 5 Documentaries of 2015
 Shortlisted as one of the 15 Documentary films being considered for an Academy Award

References

External links
 Official Film Site
 Listen to Me Marlon at Showtime
 
 Official trailer on YouTube
 Excerpt

2015 films
Marlon Brando
British documentary films
2015 documentary films
Documentary films about actors
Films produced by John Battsek
Films directed by Stevan Riley
Collage film
2010s English-language films
2010s British films